The 2018–19 Colgate Raiders men's basketball team represented Colgate University during the 2018–19 NCAA Division I men's basketball season. The Raiders, led by eighth-year head coach Matt Langel, played their home games at Cotterell Court in Hamilton, New York as members of the Patriot League. They finished the season 24-11, 13-5 to tie for first place. In the Patriot League tournament, they defeated Boston University, Navy, and  Bucknell to win the Patriot League tournament. As a result, they received an automatic bid to the NCAA Tournament where they lost in the first round to Tennessee.

Previous season
The Raiders finished the 2017–18 season 19–14, 12–6 in Patriot League play to finish in second place. They defeated Lafayette and Holy Cross to advance to the championship game of the Patriot League tournament where they lost to Bucknell. They were invited to the College Basketball Invitational where they lost in the first round to San Francisco.

Offseason

Departures

Incoming transfers

2018 recruiting class

Roster

Schedule and results

|-
!colspan=9 style=| Non-conference regular season

|-
!colspan=9 style=| Patriot League regular season

|-
!colspan=9 style=| Patriot League tournament

|-
!colspan=9 style=| NCAA tournament

References

Colgate Raiders men's basketball seasons
Colgate
Colgate
Colgate
Colgate